Vendekumpoil is a hamlet in the Malappuram District, Kerala, India. It is located about 23 kilometers from the city of Nilambur.

Tourism
This village is located in the Nilambur and Thiruvampady tourist belt. Lot of small waterfalls and view points are located here

Culture
Vendakkumpoyil village is a predominantly Christian populated area.

Transportation
Vendakumpoyil village connects to other parts of India through Nilambur town.  State Highway No.28 starts from Nilambur and connects to Ooty, Mysore and Bangalore through Highways.12,29 and 181. National highway No.66 passes through Ramanattukara and the northern stretch connects to Goa and Mumbai.  The southern stretch connects to Cochin and Trivandrum.   State.  The nearest airport is at Kozhikode.  The nearest major railway station is at Feroke.

References

Villages in Malappuram district
Nilambur area